Group C of the 2021 Africa Cup of Nations took place from 10 to 18 January 2022. The group consisted of debutants Comoros, Gabon, Ghana and Morocco.

Morocco and Gabon as the top two teams, along with Comoros as one of the four best third-placed teams, advanced to the round of 16.

Teams

Notes

Standings

Matches

Morocco vs Ghana

Comoros vs Gabon

Morocco vs Comoros

Gabon vs Ghana

Gabon vs Morocco

Ghana vs Comoros

References

External links
 

2021 Africa Cup of Nations